The Battery Island, part of the Passage Group within the Furneaux Group, is a  granite island, located in Bass Strait south of Cape Barren Island, in Tasmania, in south-eastern Australia.

Fauna
Recorded breeding seabird and wader species include little penguin, Pacific gull, silver gull, sooty oystercatcher and Caspian tern.

See also

 List of islands of Tasmania

References

Furneaux Group
Islands of Bass Strait
Islands of North East Tasmania